This is a list of notable restaurants in New York City. New York City’s restaurant industry had 23,650 establishments in 2019.

Restaurants in New York City

 54 Below
 Bickford's
 BurritoVille
 Golden Krust Caribbean Bakery & Grill
 Grotta Azzurra
 The Halal Guys
 El Internacional
 Jahn's
 Jing Fong
 Joe's Shanghai
 Kennedy Fried Chicken
 Lucciola (Italian restaurant)
 Korilla BBQ
 Max and Mina's
 The Meatball Shop
 Munson Diner
 Old Homestead Steakhouse
 Piccolo Cafe
 Ravagh Persian Grill
 T.G.I. Friday's – first location opened in 1965 in New York City
 Xi'an Famous Foods
 Zaro's Bakery

Brooklyn 

 Childs Restaurants (Coney Island Boardwalk location)
 Childs Restaurants (Surf Avenue location)
 Defonte's
 Gargiulo's Italian Restaurant
 Junior's Restaurant
 Nathan's Famous
 Peter Luger Steak House – Brooklyn location was established in 1887 as "Carl Luger's Café, Billiards and Bowling Alley"

Manhattan 

 Aquavit
 Asiate 
 Atera
 Atlantic Grill 
 Baby Brasa
 Balthazar 
 Barbetta 
 Barbuto
 Barney Greengrass
 Batard 
 Le Bernardin 
 Blue Hill 
 Café Boulud 
 Caravaggio 
 Carbone
 Carlyle Restaurant 
 Charles' Southern Style Kitchen 
 Chef's Table at Brooklyn Fare
 China Grill Management 
 Cipriani S.A. 
 Clinton Street Baking Company & Restaurant 
 Le Coucou
 Daniel 
 Delmonico's 
 Dirt Candy
 Dorrian's Red Hand Restaurant 
 Eleven Madison Park 
 Ellen's Stardust Diner 
 L'Entrecôte 
 El Quijote
 Ferrara Bakery and Cafe 
 Fraunces Tavern 
 Gallagher's Steak House 
 Gotham Bar and Grill 
 Gramercy Tavern 
 Gray's Papaya 
 La Grenouille 
 Grotta Azzurra
 Guss' Pickles 
 H&H Bagels 
 The Halal Guys 
 Hallo Berlin 
 Hop Kee
 IDT Megabite Cafe 
 J.G. Melon 
 Jean Georges
 Joe Allen (restaurant) 
 Joe's Shanghai 
 Julius 
 Kappo Masa Restaurant
 Katz's Delicatessen 
 Keens Steakhouse 
 King's Carriage House 
 Kossar's Bialys 
 Lusardi's 
 Magnolia Bakery 
 Marea 
 Masa 
 Matsugen 
 McSorley's Old Ale House – oldest "Irish" tavern in New York City; located at 15 East 7th Street in the East Village neighborhood of Manhattan; one of the last of the "men only" pubs, only admitting women after legally being forced to do so in 1970
 Metropolitan Museum of Art Roof Garden 
 Murray's Sturgeon Shop 
 Numero 28 
 One If By Land, Two If By Sea Restaurant 
 The Original Soup Man 
 Grand Central Oyster Bar & Restaurant 
 P. J. Clarke's 
 The Palm 
 Papaya King 
 Patsy's
 Le Pavillon
 Peanut Butter & Co. 
 Per Se 
 Pete's Tavern
 Pommes Frites 
 Porter House New York
 Rainbow Room 
 Rao's 
 Ray's Candy Store 
 Restaurant Aquavit 
 Rolfe's Chop House 
 Russian Tea Room – opened in 1927 by former members of the Russian Imperial Ballet, as a gathering place for Russian expatriates; became famous as a gathering place for those in the entertainment industry
 Salumeria Biellese
 Salumeria Rosi Parmacotto 
 Sardi's 
 Sasabune 
 Second Avenue Deli 
 Serendipity 3 
 Shopsins 
 Shun Lee Palace
 Le Soleil 
 Smith & Wollensky 
 Sparks Steak House 
 Strip House 
 Sushi of Gari 
 Sushi Nakazawa
 Sushi Seki 
 Sushi Yasuda 
 Sylvia's Restaurant of Harlem 
 Taïm 
 Tavern on the Green – reopened as a restaurant on April 24, 2014, after being used as a public visitors' center and gift shop run by the New York City Department of Parks and Recreation from 2010 to 2012
 Tom's Restaurant 
 Tribeca Grill 
 Umberto's Clam House 
 Union Square Cafe 
 Upland
 Veniero's 
 Veselka 
 The Water Club – American traditional cuisine restaurant moored on a barge on the East River at East 30th Street
 West Bank Cafe 
 Wo Hop
 Yonah Shimmel's Knish Bakery
 ZZ's Clam Bar

Pizzerias

 Di Fara Pizza 
 Grimaldi's Pizzeria 
 Joe's Pizza
 John's of Bleecker Street
 Juliana's Pizza
 Kesté
 Lombardi's Pizza
 Lucali
 Patsy's Pizzeria – historic coal-oven pizzeria, regarded as one of New York's original pizzerias; known for its traditional New York-style thin crust pizza
 Ray's Pizza – "Ray's Pizza", and its many variations such as "Ray's Original Pizza", "Famous Ray's Pizza" and "World-Famous Original Ray's Pizza", are the names of dozens of pizzerias in the New York City area that are generally completely independent (a few have multiple locations) but may have similar menus, signs, and logos.
 Roberta's 
 Spumoni Gardens – originally conceived as an ice and spumoni stand prior to World War II; eventually grew into a full-scale pizzeria known primarily for its Sicilian pizza and ices during the mid-1950s
 Totonno's

Defunct restaurants

  21 Club
  Andanada 
  Aquagrill
  BiCE Ristorante
  Bouley 
  Brasserie Julien 
  Brasserie Les Halles 
  Bridge Cafe 
  Burger Heaven  
  Cafe Chambord
  Café Nicholson
  Candle Cafe 
  Carnegie Deli
  The Cattleman
  Chelsea Place
  Childs Restaurants
  Le Cirque 
  Cloud Club
  The Colony 
  Corton 
  La Côte Basque
  Del Pezzo Restaurant
  Dubrow's Cafeteria
  Elaine's
  El Faro Restaurant
  Empire Diner
  Fashion Cafe
  The Florent
  The Four Seasons Restaurant 
  Gage and Tollner
  Horn & Hardart
  Jekyll & Hyde Club
  Jimmy Ryan’s (jazz club)
  Jimmy Weston's (jazz club)
  Kiev Restaurant 
  LaRue – former nightclub from 1928 to 1968 at 58th and Park Streets
  Lindy's 
  Loft, Incorporated
  Longchamps
  Lüchow's
  Lundy's Restaurant
  Lutèce
  Manganaro's
  Mars 2112
  Mas
  Maxwell's Plum
  Mo Gridder's
  Moondance Diner
  Mori
  Munson Diner
  Old London Inc.
  Onyx Club
  Penny Cafeteria
  Ratner's
  Reuben's Restaurant
  Rutley's Inc.
  Shanley's Restaurants
  The Spotted Pig 
  Stage Deli
  Stock Exchange Luncheon Club – former members-only dining club, on the seventh floor of the New York Stock Exchange at 11 Wall Street in Manhattan
  Stork Club – former nightclub from 1929 to 1965
  Teany 
  Toots Shor's Restaurant
  Wd~50 
  Windows on the World

See also
 List of Michelin starred restaurants in New York City
 Lists of restaurants
 New York Restaurant Week

References

External links
 
 
 
 
 
 
 

 
New York City
New York City-related lists